The Princess Mary's Royal Air Force Hospital Halton, was the first Royal Air Force hospital to be built that was dedicated to air force personnel. Located on what was then the largest of the RAF camps at RAF Halton in Buckinghamshire, England, the hospital treated over 20,000 patients during the Second World War and was the first place in the world to use penicillin on a large-scale. The hospital continued in use throughout the Cold War, only closing in 1996 due to defence cuts.

History
The first hospital at the camp was formed in 1919 as RAF General Hospital, Halton, on the south side of RAF Halton Camp. This consisted of some wooden huts on the southwest side of the base, overlooking the main part of camp. This early incarnation included a medical school, and an isolation hospital which had three huts. The post-First World War air force was consolidated in 1920, (180 flying squadrons had been reduced to 25 on active service) and medical provision for the RAF would be undertaken at existing army hospitals apart from a few key RAF locations, such as at Halton which had the apprenticeships school. In 1925, the pathology unit was moved from the RAF Hospital at Finchley to Halton, with the rest of the hospital at Finchley moving to Uxbridge. However, by the mid-1920s, a larger more modern hospital was needed, and a design was approved in 1923, but it did not reach completion for over four years. The new hospital was opened by Princess Mary on 31 October 1927, and in 1929, treated nearly 2,700 patients. In 1938, one year before the hostilities of the Second World War, the hospital treated over 7,500 patients.

At the start of the Second World War, Halton was used as an initial assessment point for aeromedical evacuations from the continent (Europe). These flights started a mere 25 days into the declaration of war. Throughout the Second World War, Halton hospital treated over 20,000 patients and also became the first hospital in the world to use penicillin on a large-scale. One staff member on the ophthalmic ward had the unusual task of collecting empty face-cream jars and sending them to Professor Florey at Oxford, who would return the jars with, what was at that time, precious penicillin. Another one of its functions was testing water and sewerage samples from the many bases around the UK, which were tested at the department for Pathology and Tropical Medicine. Of the 150 samples tested in 1944, 11 were found to be unsatisfactory. Aircrew who had suffered burns were treated at the hospital during the Second World War, and in January 1953, the Air Ministry approved a new unit for plastic surgery which would consist of 60 beds, though like other functions at the hospital, this was also available for the general public. The admissions and treatment records for 1945 showed that the hospital at Halton admitted 11,311 patients, and all but eight of these were Royal Air Force personnel.

RAF Hospital Halton was widely known within the medical community post-war for its renal unit. In the 1970s, the hospital possessed the only mobile dialysis unit in Europe (the other one being in the United States).

The hospital closed on 31 March 1996. A brick memorial now stands at the point where the entrance to the hospital.

Specialisations
Besides functioning as the hospital for RAF Halton, the hospital had the following specialisations:

Anaesthesiology
Aviation medicine
Burns and plastic surgery
Dermatology
ENT
General surgery
Gynaecology and obstetrics
Maxillo-facial surgery
Medicine
Nephrology
Neurology
Oncology
Ophthalmology
Oral surgery
Orthopaedic surgery
Paediatrics
Pathology and tropical medicine
Psychiatry
Radiology
Urology

Badge
A badge for the unit was awarded by the Queen in January 1960. It featured a lamp against a red cross. The motto of the unit was Vigilance.

Notable personnel

Emily Blair, Matron-in-chief (1938 – 1943)
Helen Cargill, served at the hospital in the 1920s
John Cooke, medical division officer in 1972
Joanna Cruickshank, matron-in-chief (1921 – 1930)
Douglas Bader, had new legs (tin pins) fitted at the hospital, and danced with one of the PMRAFNS nurses to celebrate
Immanuel J. Klette, patient at the hospital after a crash in September 1943
Geoffrey Page, was treated at the hospital before being moved to the plastic surgery hospital at East Grinstead
Charles Soutar, was in command of the hospital in the early 1970s
Gladys Taylor, matron-in-chief (1943 – 1948)
Katherine Watt, matron-in-chief (1930 – 1938)
Harold Whittingham, worked as director of the Central Laboratory in the late 1920s
Frank Whittle, admitted as a patient in May 1944 with a skin complaint

References

Sources

Hospital buildings completed in 1927
Royal Air Force stations in Buckinghamshire
Military units and formations established in 1919
1919 establishments in England
Military units and formations disestablished in 1996
Defunct hospitals in England
Hospitals in Buckinghamshire
Military hospitals in the United Kingdom
Royal Air Force Medical Services
British military hospitals